Jack Crawford defeated Harry Hopman 4–6, 6–3, 3–6, 6–3, 6–1 in the final to win the men's singles tennis title at the 1932 Australian Championships.

Seeds
  Jack Crawford (champion)
  Jiro Sato (semifinals)
  Takeichi Harada (first round)
  Harry Hopman (finalist)
  Ryosuke Nunoi (quarterfinals)
  Ray Dunlop (second round)
  Jack Cummings (second round)
  Don Turnbull (second round)

Draw

Finals

Earlier rounds

Section 1

Section 2

Notes

References

External links
 

1932
1932 in Australian tennis
Men's Singles